The BMW M88 is a straight-6 DOHC petrol engine which was produced from 1978 to 1989. It is based on the DOHC version of the BMW M49 engine, which was used in the BMW 3.0CSi racing cars.

The M88 was produced alongside the BMW M30 engine, as the higher performance engine. In North America up until 1989, the BMW S38 engine was used instead of the M88. In 1989, an updated version of the S38 became the worldwide replacement for the M88. The M30B35LE is a SOHC engine which is based on the M88/1; this is sometimes referred to as the M90.

Design
BMW engineers used DOHC valvetrain on a production engine for the first time on the M88, with the camshafts driven by a single-row timing chain. Kugelfischer fuel injection was used with individual throttle valves and the distinctive six individual throttle bodies.

The construction is an aluminium cylinder head and a cast iron block.

Versions

M88

The M88 was the original iteration of the engine and was fitted to the BMW M1. A dry sump is used.

Applications:
 1978-1981 M1

M88/1
For the BMW M1 Procar single-make series, the M88 engine was bored out marginally to reach . This racing version, called the M88/1, met the Group 4 regulations. This race engine produced  in Procar specifications. This version had forged pistons, sharper camshafts, bigger valves, as well as oil cooling for the transmission and rear differential.

Applications:
 1979-1980 Procar BMW M1

M88/2
For Group 5 racing, the M88 engine was turbocharged and became known as the M88/2. It was downsleeved and had a shorter stroke to displace , which with the 1.4 turbo factor placed it in the 4.5-liter class.

Applications:
 Group 5 racing cars

M88/3

The M88/1 engine was modified for use in the E24 M635CSi and E28 M5 and was known as the M88/3. It has a compression ratio of 10.5:1.

The M88/3 was also fitted to the South African BMW 745i, due to packaging problems with the turbocharged M102 engine which was used in other markets.

Applications:
 1983-1989 E24 M635CSi
 1984-1987 E28 M5
 1984-1987 E23 745i (South Africa only)

M30B35
The M30B35LE is a lower performance, two-valve, SOHC version of the M88/1 engine, also known as the M90. It utilizes the same block as the M88 and maintains the same bore and stroke, but borrows its head from the BMW M30 engine family. Different years of this engine uses both Bosch Motronic and Bosch L-Jetronic engine management systems.
Typically identified by a white L painted on the block behind the oil filter housing and coolant water passages on the side of the block.

As sold in Europe and most other markets (except North America), this used a compression ratio of 9.3:1, did not have a catalytic converter and produced .

Applications:
 1979-1981 E12 M535i
 1978-1982 E24 635CSi
 1978-1982 E23 735i

See also
BMW S14 - Four-cylinder engine based on the M88

References

M88
World Sportscar Championship engines
Straight-six engines
Gasoline engines by model